Chloroclystis sordida is a moth in the family Geometridae. It was described by Warren in 1903. It is endemic to New Guinea.

References

External links

Moths described in 1903
sordida
Endemic fauna of New Guinea